El noveno mandamiento (Lit: The Ninth Commandment / English title: Forbidden Attraction) is a Mexican telenovela produced by Lucero Suárez for Televisa in 2001.

On Monday, January 15, 2001, Canal de las Estrellas started broadcasting El noveno mandamiento weekdays at 5:00pm, replacing El precio de tu amor. The last episode was broadcast on Friday, May 4, 2001 with Atrévete a olvidarme replacing it the Monday.

The 1st part Daniela Castro and Armando Araiza starred as protagonists, while Chantal Andere and Salvador Sánchez starred as antagonists.

The 2nd part Daniela Castro and Francisco Gattorno starred as protagonists, while Alma Muriel, Salvador Sánchez and Ana Patricia Rojo starred as antagonists. Alejandro Ibarra and Juan Carlos Serrán starred as stellar performances.

Plot 
The story occurs in a small Veracruz town where brothers Rodrigo and Bruno Betancourt vie with each other for Ana's love, thus breaking the ninth commandment, not to covet thy neighbor's wife.

Isabel suffers from diabetes. While she does not have a meek personality, ever since the death of her parents, she is easily manipulated by her sister Clara.

Clara lives tormented with the thought that she will never marry, since in that small town, the only bachelor is her sister's fiancé, Leandro, who initiates an uncontrollable passion in her. The wedding between Isabel and Leandro is postponed because he must make an important business trip.

Clara attempts to persuade him to call off the wedding saying that Isabel only has a short time to live, but he refuses to listen. On the contrary, Leandro and Isabel agree to spend the last night together before he leaves for the trip. They decide to meet in the stable, but Clara finds out.

Along with her faithful servant, Andres, Clara plans an accident so that Isabel never makes it to the date. Instead Clara goes to the dark stable, with Isabel's perfume and dressed like her. Leandro, who had some drinks, spends the night with Clara. Isabel feels betrayed when she sees them together.

Clara makes Isabel think that Leandro was with her because he felt pity for her, since she was a dying woman. Clara pretends that she is pregnant and Isabel falls into a severe crisis, due to her diabetes, and thinking that she will die, makes Leandro promise that he will marry Clara.

Leandro is extremely unhappy attached to a woman whom he loathes, but does not give up and finds proof that Clara tricked him into sleeping with her. After Isabel realizes his innocence, they make love for the first time. Andrés tries to steal the proof which incriminates Clara.

But while fighting, Leandro falls and hits his head, losing his memory. Taking advantage of the situation, Clara Makes Leandro believe that they have always been a happy couple, but that her sister has always tried to come between them. Clara also threatens to kill Isabel, so she flees to Mexico City, where she discovers that she is pregnant. Leandro regains his memory and Clara can no longer keep the lie of her pregnancy.

When Leandro is about to abandon her, she causes another accident and blames Leandro for it. She makes him feel guilty that she has "lost" their child. Tied by guilt and thinking that Isabel is with another man, Leandro stays with Clara in a rocky and obsessive relationship. Leandro unburdens himself with alcohol, always debating to stay or to go; Clara living with his rejections, while always desperately trying to make him love her, or at least keep him by her side.

Clara then asks a dying cousin to leave her newborn baby under her and Leandro's care. The cousin dies after making Leandro swear that he will be like a father to the baby. However, the baby also dies and Clara replaces her with the daughter of Andres, her servant.

The baby is named Fabiola. Isabel gives birth to a baby girl and names her Ana, but Isabel dies in a car accident when Ana is a young girl. Time flies and Ana goes to Clara's ranch without knowing who her parents are. There she meets Fabiola, who grows up to be the owner of the ranch "Las Lágrimas" (The Tears).

Ana also meets the neighbors, Rodrigo and Bruno Betancourt, heirs of the best lands in that region. Fabiola is engaged to Rodrigo, but then Ana appears. Both brothers want Ana. Twenty years before, it was two sisters and one love, but then the story repeats itself, now, with two brothers and one love.

Cast 
1st part

 Daniela Castro as Isabel Durán
 Armando Araiza as Leandro Villanueva
 Chantal Andere as Clara Durán
 Salvador Sánchez as Andrés Roldán Martínez
 Martha Roth as Doña Eugenia D`Anjou Vda. de Betancourt
 Ernesto Godoy as Ramiro González
 Lupita Lara as Elena de Villanueva
 Gustavo Negrete as Álvaro Villanueva
 Héctor Sáez as Father Juan Molina
 Arlette Pacheco as Alicia Jiménez
 Zulema Cruz as Carmen Juárez de Roldán
 Luis Reynoso as Óscar
 Bárbara Gómez as Tomasa
 Maripaz García as Margarita
 Martín Rojas as Juancho
 Liza Burton as Salomé
 Jorge Capin as Efrén González
 Ricardo Vera as Víctor
 Jana Raluy as Lola
 Fernando Morín as David Betancourt D`Anjou
 Guadalupe Bolaños as Luisa de Betancourt
 María Montejo as Doña Rosario
 Stefy Ebergenyl as Anita
 Geraldine Galván as Fabiolita
 Jorge Trejo as Brunito
 Landa Solares as Rodriguito

2nd part

 Daniela Castro as Ana Jiménez/Ana Villanueva Durán
 Francisco Gattorno as Rodrigo Betancourt
 Alma Muriel as Clara Durán de Villanueva
 Ana Patricia Rojo as Fabiola Durán del Valle
 Alejandro Ibarra as Bruno Betancourt
 Juan Carlos Serrán as Leandro Villanueva
 Salvador Sánchez as Andrés Roldán Martínez
 Martha Roth as Doña Eugenia D`Anjou Vda. de Betancourt
 Silvia Lomelí as Gabriela Treviño
 Roberto Miquel as Jorge Lozano Castro
 Marcia Coutiño as Sofía Gómez
 Alejandro Ruiz as Diego Gascón
 Hilda Aguirre as María de Treviño
 Octavio Galindo as Vicente Treviño
 Arlette Pacheco as Alicia Jiménez
 Arsenio Campos as Ramiro González
 Zulema Cruz as Carmen Juárez de Roldán
 Yurem Rojas as Enrique Lozano "El Ratón"
 Claudia Elisa Aguilar as Sabina Vda. de Pérez
 Radamés de Jesús as Ramón Pérez
 Alberto Estrella as Felipe Ruiz
 Lidia Jiménez as Eufrasia
 Polly as Zulema
 Juan Imperio as Mariano
 Graciela Bernardos as Lola
 Luis Reynoso as Óscar
 Eduardo Cáceres as Bernardo Lozano
 Arturo Paulet as Onésimo
 Ulises Pliego as Pablo

References

External links
  at esmas.com 
 

2001 telenovelas
Mexican telenovelas
2001 Mexican television series debuts
2001 Mexican television series endings
Spanish-language telenovelas
Television shows set in Mexico
Televisa telenovelas